Amrik is an Indian masculine given name that may refer to
Amrik Anand (born 1947), Indian cricketer
Amrik Singh (1948–1984), President of the Indian Sikh Students Federation
Amrik Singh Cheema (1918–1982), Indian civil servant and author
Amrik Singh Dhillon, Punjabi Sikh Indian politician
Amrik Virk (born 1963 or 1964), Canadian politician

 Indian masculine given names